The USC Trojans Rugby Football Club is the official rugby team of the University of Southern California. The club competes in the PAC Rugby Conference, the Southern California Rugby Football Union, and the Gold Coast Conference of Intercollegiate Rugby. Laloa Milford is the current head coach of the program after a long international career with most recently the Santa Monica Rugby Club and previously with Castres Olympique in the French Top-14 League. Milford took over the program in 2015 after USC alumnus Dave Lytle retired after coaching the team since 1988. Lytle had achieved good success, leading the Trojans to division championships in 2005 and 2009. Dominic Riebli is the current Director of Rugby. Austin Reed and Bryan Randles were both standout players during their undergraduate educations and returned as alumni coaches.

USC's home is at the McAllister Field, located near the Fraternity Row at USC in downtown Los Angeles, California.

History
Rugby is USC's oldest and most prestigious club sport. The team was founded in 1886. It was briefly replaced by American Football at USC before a British professor on tenure brought the game back to the university in 1910.

In the first issue of the student newspaper The Daily Trojan, then called The Daily Southern Californian, was published Sept. 16, 1912 and in the first edition of the paper included announcements of tryouts for the USC rugby team.

USC Rugby Hall of Fame member Dave Lytle retired in 2015 after 28 years of coaching. In addition to his many victories, he holds the team record for the longest keg stand at 2 minutes, 23 seconds.

In 2009, USC beat UCLA 17-14, their first victory over the Bruins in many years and the last time they've done so.  That team ended up undefeated in league play, beating California State University, Fullerton 51-12 in the championship. They went on to beat University of San Diego in the promotion match to earn a spot in Division I the following season.

The USC Rugby War Cry is as follows:

 Boom chicka boom bop, 
Boom chicka boom bop, 
Boom chicka chicka chicka chicka chicka boom bop, 
Here we are, 
Here we are, 
'SC, 'SC, ra ra ra, 
T-R-O-J-A-N-S, 
Trojans!

Notable players
 Angelo Reviglio, Class of 2023
 Corbin Bennett, Class of 2017
 Joseph Krassenstein, Class of 2015
 Zach Timm, Class of 2013
 John Akiba, Class of 2014
 Todd Lorell, Class of 2010
 Austin Reed, Class of 2010
 Gareth Williams, Class of 2009
 Sean Sullivan, class of 1993
 Jonathan Freeman, Class of 1992 (Post-Grad)
 Dave Lytle, Class of 1986
 Tom Barrack, Class of 1969
 Harry "Blackjack" Smith, Class of 1939
 Payton Jordan, Class of 1939

References

External links
 

USC Trojans rugby
Rugby union teams in Los Angeles
American rugby union teams
Men's Rugby
1886 establishments in California
Rugby clubs established in 1886